Belize competed at the 2022 World Athletics Championships in Eugene, United States, from 15 to 24 July 2022. Belize entered 1 athlete.

Entrants
Track and road events

References

World Championships in Athletics
2022
Nations at the 2022 World Athletics Championships